The 1993 Nordic Figure Skating Championships were held from February 12th through February 14th, 1993 in Aarhus, Denmark. The competition was open to elite figure skaters from Nordic countries. Skaters competed in two disciplines, men's singles and ladies' singles, across two levels: senior (Olympic-level) and junior.

Senior results

Men

Ladies

Junior results

Men

Ladies

References

Nordic Figure Skating Championships, 1993
Nordic Figure Skating Championships
Sport in Aarhus
International figure skating competitions hosted by Denmark
Nordic Figure Skating Championships, 1993